The 1974 edition of the Campeonato Carioca kicked off on August 3, 1974 and ended on December 22, 1974. It was organized by FCF (Federação Carioca de Futebol, or Carioca Football Federation). Twelve teams participated. Flamengo won the title for the 17th time. no teams were relegated.

System
The tournament would be divided in four stages:
 Taça Guanabara: The twelve teams all played in a single round-robin format against each other. The champions qualified to the Final phase. The eight best teams qualified to the Second round.
 Taça Oscar Wright da Silva: The remaining eight teams all played in a single round-robin format against each other. The champions qualified to the Final phase.
 Taça Pedro Magalhães Corrêa: The eight teams all played in a single round-robin format against each other. The champions qualified to the Final phase.
Final phase: The three stage winners played in a single round-robin format against each other. the team with the most points won the title.

Championship

Taça Guanabara

Taça Oscar Wright da Silva

Taça Pedro Magalhães Corrêa

Final phase

Top Scores

References

Campeonato Carioca seasons
Carioca